Yang Zhiliang (born November 1962) is a vice admiral (zhongjiang) of the People's Liberation Army Navy (PLAN). He has been Political Commissar of the South Sea Fleet since December 2019, and formerly served as Political Commissar of Equipment Department of the People's Liberation Army Navy. He attained the rank of rear admiral (shaojiang) in January 2017, and was promoted to the rank of vice admiral (zhongjiang) in December 2019.

Biography
Yang was born into a family of farming background in the town of Xieqiying, in Wuzhi County, Henan in November 1962. He has a younger brother. He enlisted in the People's Liberation Army (PLA) in 1981. In 1983 he was accepted to Dalian Naval Academy. After graduating in March 1988, he took part in the Johnson South Reef Skirmish and won First Class Merit. In 2003 he was transferred to Shigatse, Tibet Autonomous Region. He was Political Commissar of the People's Liberation Army Navy Qingdao Support Base between 2010 and 2011. Then he was Deputy  Political Commissar of the North Sea Fleet Air Force. He was Deputy Director of Political Department of the South Sea Fleet in 2015, and held that office until January 2018. He became Political Commissar of the People's Liberation Army Naval Research Institute in January 2018, but having held the position for only six months, and then he was appointed Political Commissar of Equipment Department of the People's Liberation Army Navy. In December 2019 he was promoted to become Political Commissar of the South Sea Fleet, replacing Liu Mingli.

Personal life
His wife Qiu Jirong is a doctor at a hospital in Dalian, Liaoning. Their son was born in 1988.

References

1962 births
Living people
People from Wuzhi County
Dalian Naval Academy alumni
People's Liberation Army Navy admirals